Sea potato may refer to :
Colpomenia peregrina, a species of brown algae more commonly known as oyster thief or bladder weed
Leathesia marina, formerly Leathesia difformis, another species of brown algae more commonly known as sea cauliflower
 Species of littoral sea urchins, especially heart urchins
Echinocardium cordatum, a specific species of urchin, commonly known as common heart urchin.
Echinocardium flavescens, called the yellow sea potato

Animal common name disambiguation pages